Kursi may refer to:

Arabic word for throne
The Arabic word for Footstool, but misunderstood for throne. It has been borrowed into Persian, Bengali, Turkish, Punjabi, Hindi and Urdu with similar meaning related to "chair", and may also be used for an official title, such as that of a president or chairman.

Examples of terms derived from the Arabic or related Semitic words for throne or chair:
Ayat al-Kursi, "Verse of the Throne", a verse from the Quran
Bey al-Kursi, "Bey of the Throne", a term equivalent to reigning prince, used for instance in Tunisia

Throne village, Arabic "qaryat al-kursi", seat of a local ruler in Late Ottoman-era Palestine

Baltic
Kursi, the local name for the Curonians, a Baltic tribe who gave their name to present-day Courland.
Related place names:
Kursi, Harju County, village in Kuusalu Parish, Harju County, Estonia
Kursi, Jõgeva County, village in Puurmani Parish, Jõgeva County, Estonia
Kursi, Lääne-Viru County, village in Tamsalu Parish, Lääne-Viru County, Estonia